Chad Anthony Jerome Rau (born January 18, 1987) is an American professional ice hockey forward who last played for Glasgow Clan in the UK's Elite Ice Hockey League. Rau previously played for HC Slovan Bratislava of the Kontinental Hockey League (KHL) and Minnesota Wild. He was selected by the Toronto Maple Leafs in the 7th round (228th overall) of the 2005 NHL Entry Draft.

Playing career
He spent a single season in the USHL with the Des Moines Buccaneers in 2004–05, tallying 31 goals and 40 assists in 57 games, while receiving USHL Rookie of the Year honors. In 2014, he was inducted into the Buccaneers' Hall of Fame.

Rau attended Colorado College from 2005 to 2009, receiving All-America Second Team honors in 2008 and 2009.

On May 17, 2010, Rau was signed as a free agent by the Minnesota Wild to a two-year contract. He was assigned to play for the Houston Aeros at the start of the 2010–11 season.

During the 2011–12 season, he made his NHL debut with the Wild and scored his first NHL goal, the eventual game-winning goal, in a 5–2 victory against Kari Lehtonen of the Dallas Stars on January 21, 2012. On February 19, 2012, he scored his second NHL goal in his fifth NHL game.

On February 5, 2014, the Minnesota Wild traded Rau to the San Jose Sharks in exchange for Curt Gogol. He was immediately assigned to AHL affiliate, the Worcester Sharks.

After spending the first five seasons of his professional career primarily in the AHL, Rau opted to sign abroad on a one-year contract in the Austrian Hockey League with EHC Black Wings Linz on July 22, 2014. He played 24 games with the Black Wings, collecting three goals and four assists. He transferred to SaiPa of the Finnish Elite League (Liiga) on December 31, 2014. In his second year with SaiPa (2015–16), Rau amassed 30 goals and 19 assists in 66 Liiga contests and won the Aarne Honkavaara Trophy as the league's leading goalscorer as well as the Liiga Gentleman of the Year award.

After concluding his successful tenure in Finland, Rau opted to leave as a free agent and signed a one-year contract with new KHL entrant, HC Kunlun Red Star of China on July 22, 2016.

Following a single season with Kunlun, Rau left as a free agent to continue in the KHL by signing a one-year agreement with HC Neftekhimik Nizhnekamsk on May 10, 2017. After splitting the 2017–18 season, between Nizhnekamsk and Avangard Omsk, Rau continued in the KHL signing as a free agent on a one-year contract with Slovak based, HC Slovan Bratislava, on August 3, 2018.

On 25 July 2019, Rau agreed a move to UK EIHL side Glasgow Clan.

Personal
Chad's younger brother Kyle played NCAA hockey with the University of Minnesota and currently plays within the Minnesota Wild organization in the National Hockey League.

Career statistics

Regular season and playoffs

International

Awards and honors

References

External links
 

1987 births
Living people
American men's ice hockey centers
Avangard Omsk players
Colorado College Tigers men's ice hockey players
Des Moines Buccaneers players
EHC Black Wings Linz players
Glasgow Clan players
Houston Aeros (1994–2013) players
Ice hockey players from Minnesota
Iowa Wild players
HC Kunlun Red Star players
Minnesota Wild players
People from Eden Prairie, Minnesota
HC Neftekhimik Nizhnekamsk players
SaiPa players
HC Slovan Bratislava players
Sportspeople from the Minneapolis–Saint Paul metropolitan area
Toronto Maple Leafs draft picks
Worcester Sharks players
AHCA Division I men's ice hockey All-Americans
American expatriate ice hockey players in Austria
American expatriate ice hockey players in China
American expatriate ice hockey players in Finland
American expatriate ice hockey players in Russia
American expatriate ice hockey players in Slovakia
American expatriate ice hockey players in Scotland